Thomas Baylis may refer to:

 Thomas Henry Baylis (1817–1908), English barrister and judge
 Thomas Baylis (businessman) (1823–1876), British businessman
 Tom Baylis (born 1996), English cyclist